The Elusive Ideal: Equal Educational Opportunity and the Federal Role in Boston's Public Schools, 1950–1985 is a social history book written by Adam R. Nelson on the relationship between the Boston public schools and local, state, and federal public policy in the mid-20th century. The University of Chicago Press published the title in May 2005.

References

External links 

 

American history books
History books about education
Books about politics of the United States
University of Chicago Press books
Public schools in Massachusetts